The Order of Courage (Orden Muzhestva) is a state decoration of the Russian Federation first established on March 2, 1994 by Presidential Decree 442 to recognise selfless acts of courage and valour.  Its statute was amended three times, first on January 6, 1999 by Presidential Decree 19, again on September 7, 2010 by Presidential Decree 1099, and finally on December 16, 2011 by Presidential Decree 1631.  The Order of Courage nominally replaced the Soviet Order "For Personal Courage" in the post-USSR Russian awards system.

Award statute 
The Order of Courage is awarded to citizens of the Russian Federation who showed dedication, courage and bravery in protecting public order, fighting crime, in rescuing people during natural disasters, fires, accidents and other emergencies, as well as for bold and decisive actions committed during the performance of military or civil duties under conditions involving a risk to life.

The Order of Courage may be awarded posthumously and may be awarded multiple times to the same recipient.

Individuals already awarded three Orders of Courage may be awarded the title of Hero of the Russian Federation for a fourth selfless act of courage.

It may also be awarded to foreign nationals who showed dedication, courage and bravery in the rescue of Russian citizens during natural disasters, fires, accidents and other emergencies outside of the Russian Federation.

The Order of Courage is worn on the left side of the chest and when in the presence of other medals and Orders of the Russian Federation, is located immediately after the Order of Nakhimov.

Award description 
The Order of Courage is a vaulted 40 mm wide silver cross pattée with rounded ends. The outer rim of both the obverse and reverse are embossed. At the center of the obverse is the state emblem of the Russian Federation. On the obverse, embossed rays extend outwards from the center to the outer rim in each of the cross's four arms. In the center of the reverse, the relief inscription in stylized Russian Cyrillic «МУЖЕСТВО» ("COURAGE"). On the reverse of the lower cross arm, an "N" in relief and a horizontal line reserved for the award serial number, under the line, a maker's mark.

The badge of the Order of Courage hangs from a standard Russian pentagonal mount with a ring through its suspension loop.  The mount is covered by an overlapping 24 mm wide red silk moiré ribbon with 2 mm white edge stripes.

Recipients (partial list) 
The individuals listed below were recipients of the Order of Courage:

Alexander Pozynych
Konstantin Murakhtin
Lieutenant Colonel Anatoly Vyacheslavovich Lebed (three times)
Tatyana Sapunova
Militia Lieutenant Colonel Vyacheslav Nikolaevich Mironov
Lieutenant General and politician Alu Dadashevich Alkhanov
Colonel Marina Lavrentievna Popovich
President of Chechnya Ramzan Akhmadovich Kadyrov
Former Interior, Justice and Prime Minister of Russia Sergei Vadimovich Stepashin
Colonel and President of the Republic of Ingushetia Yunus-bek Bamatgireyevich Yevkurov
Captain Sergey Vladimirovich Perets
Fleet Admiral Vladimir Nikolayevich Chernavin
Lieutenant General Vladimir Anatolyevich Shamanov
Former Justice Minister Vladimir Vasilyevich Ustinov (twice)
Lieutenant General, former President of the Republic of Ingushetia Murat Magometovich Zyazikov
Iosif Davydovich Kobzon
Private Yevgeny Aleksandrovich Rodionov (posthumous)
Professor Maksud Sadikov (posthumous)
Colonel General, former Interior Minister of Russia Vladimir Borisovich Rushailo
Army General Anatoly Vasiliyevich Kvashnin
Army General Nikolai Platonovich Patrushev
Admiral of the Fleet Ivan Matveyevich Kapitanets
Scientist, physicist, Evgeny Pavlovich Velikhov
Major General Viktor Nikolaevich Bondarev
Explorer Anatoly Mikhailovich Sagalevich
Major General Oleg Aleksandrovich Kozlov
Army General Valentin Vladimirovich Korabelnikov
Colonel General Nikolay Nikolayevich Bordyuzha
Colonel General Arkady Viktotovich Bakhin
Militia Captain Viktor Mikhailovich Adamishin (posthumous)
Francisco António De Carvalho Ventura (estrangeiro)
Alexander Ivanovich Bedritsky
French Brigadier General and astronaut Léopold Eyharts
Oleg Kukhta
Grigoriy Mihaylovich Naginskiy
NASA astronaut Nick Hague
Vitaly Churkin (posthumous)
Alexander Pechersky (posthumous)
Arsen Sergeyevich Pavlov (posthumous)
Darya Dugina (posthumous)
Gera Chausheva 
Kirill Stremousov (posthumous)
Sergei Puskepalis (posthumous)

See also
 Awards and decorations of the Russian Federation

References

External links
The Commission on State Awards under the President of the Russian Federation
Site of the President of the Russian Federation
The Russian Gazette

Orders, decorations, and medals of Russia
Russian awards
Military awards and decorations of Russia
Civil awards and decorations of Russia
Courage awards
Awards established in 1994
1994 establishments in Russia